James Arthur Clare (1857 – 4 January 1930) was an English-born international rugby union three-quarter who played club rugby for Cardiff Rugby Football Club and international rugby for Wales. He achieved just a single cap, in the second international encounter between Wales and his birth country England.

Rugby career 
Clare was born in London in 1857 but moved to Penarth in Wales, where he became a pilot in the Cardiff Docks, guiding ships through the harbour. While working in the Cardiff area he began playing rugby for Cardiff Rugby Club. In 1883 Clare was selected to represent his adopted country when he played for Wales in the opening game of the 1883 Home Nations Championship against England. This was only the third international game Wales had played and was the first ever game of the inaugural Six Nations Championship. Under the captaincy of Charles Lewis, Clare played three-quarters along with David Gwynn and Cardiff team-mate William Norton. Wales lost the game by two goals and four tries to nil, and Clare was not reselected to represent Wales again.

International matches played
Wales
  1883

Bibliography

References 

1857 births
1930 deaths
Cardiff RFC players
English rugby union players
People educated at Christ College, Brecon
Rugby union players from London
Wales international rugby union players
Rugby union three-quarters